Khangebam Jibon Singh is an Indian footballer who plays for Shillong Lajong in the I-League. He plays as a left back or in midfield positions. Singh represented India U23 in the SAFF Cup 2009 and 2012 AFC Pre-Olympic Tournament in 2011.

Career

Pailan Arrows
For the 2010-11 I-League season Singh played for I-League newcomers Indian Arrows, a team made up exclusively of Indian Under-19 players. On 3 December 2010 Singh took part in the Arrows' first ever I-League game against Chirag United. The final score was 2-1 in Chirag United's favor.

Singh started off the 2011-12 football season in the 2011 Indian Federation Cup with renamed Pailan Arrows. He was selected as the captain of team for 2011-12 season. In Pailan's first match against HAL S.C., Singh scored the only goal of the game in the 89th minute from the penalty spot which left Pailan the 1-0 winners.

Shillong Lajong F.C.
For the 2012-13 I-League season, Singh played for Shillong Lajong F.C. He scored his first goal for the club in the I-League's 5th round against Dempo, but Shillong lost that match, with 4-1 the final score.

International
On 23 February 2011, Singh played his second game for the Indian U23 against Myanmar.

Statistics

Club 
Updated 29 December 2011

National team 
Statistics accurate as of 25 December 2011

Honours

India U23
 SAFF Championship: 2009

References

External links
 Jibon Singh Goal.com profile

1990 births
Asian Games competitors for India
Association football fullbacks
East Bengal Club players
Footballers at the 2010 Asian Games
Footballers from Manipur
I-League players
India international footballers
India youth international footballers
Indian Arrows players
Indian footballers
Living people
Shillong Lajong FC players